The Germania C.I was a prototype two-seat general-purpose biplane built by Halberstadt during World War I.

Design and development
Halberstadt based the CLS.I on the earlier CL.IV design, with modifications including a modified wing profile of a lower curvature and a more streamlined rear fuselage. All these improvements were introduced to obtain a higher flight speed, (hence "S" in CLS standing for schnell, meaning "fast" in German). The prototype flew on 2 October 1918, but the aircraft didn't enter production due to the Armistice.

Halberstadt had plans for derivatives of the CLS.I armed with  revolver cannon, the CLS II and CLS X, but these designs never left the drawing board by the end of World War I.

Specifications (CLS I)

See also

References

Further reading
  
 
 

Biplanes
Single-engined tractor aircraft
1910s German military reconnaissance aircraft
Military aircraft of World War I
CLS.01
Aircraft first flown in 1918